In Virginia, the Superintendent of Public Instruction is the chief executive of the Virginia Department of Education and also serves as the Secretary of the Virginia Board of Education. Jillian Balow was appointed Virginia's 26th Superintendent of Public Instruction by Governor Glenn Youngkin, effective January 15, 2022. Balow resigned in March 2023.

Role

The Virginia Constitution states that the Superintendent be “an experienced educator.” The Superintendent of Public Instruction serves for a term coincident with the Governor making the appointment. The duties of the Superintendent of Public Instruction are addressed in Title 22.1, Chapter 3 of the Code of Virginia.

The duties of the State Superintendent of Public Instruction include:

 Serve as secretary of the Board of Education;
 Provide such assistance in his office as shall be necessary for the proper and uniform enforcement of the provisions of the school laws in cooperation with the local school authorities;
 Prepare and furnish such forms for attendance officers, teachers and other school officials as are required by law;
 (Expires July 1, 2025) At least annually, survey all local school divisions to identify critical shortages of (i) teachers and administrative personnel by geographic area, by school division, or by subject matter and (ii) school bus drivers by geographic area and local school division and report such critical shortages to each local school division and to the Virginia Retirement System.

Former Superintendents of Public Instruction

The first Superintendent of Public Instruction was William Henry Ruffner who served from March 6, 1870 - March 15, 1882.

Others holding the office include:

 Richard Ratcliffe Farr (1882-1886)
 John L. Buchanan (1886-1890)
 John E. Massey (1890-1898)
 Joseph W. Southall (1898-1906)
 Joseph Dupuy Eggleston, Jr. (1906-1912)
 Reaumur C. Stearnes (1912-1918)
 Harris Hart (1918-1931)
 Signey Bartlett Hall (1931-1941)
 Dabney Stewart Lancaster (1941-1946)
 George Tyler Miller (1946-1949)
 Dowell J. Howard (1949-1957)
 Davis Young Paschall (1957-1960)
 Woodrow W. Wilkerson (1960-1975)
 Walter Eugene Campbell (1975-1979)
 Spear John Davis (1979-1990)
 Joseph A. Spagnolo (1990-1994)
 William C. Bosher, Jr. (1994-1996)
 Richard T. LaPointe (1996-1998)
 Paul D. Stapleton (1998-1999)
 Jo Lynne DeMary (2000-2006)
 Patricia I. Wright (2006*; 2008–2014)
 Billy K. Cannaday, Jr. (2006-2008)
 Steven R. Staples (2014-2018)
 Steven M. Constantino* (2018)
 Dr. James F. Lane (2018-2022)
 Jillian Balow (2022-2023)

(*) denotes acting/interim role

References

External links
 Virginia Board of Education
 Virginia Department of Education
 Governor of Virginia

Public education in Virginia